

Belgium
 Belgian Congo – Félix Fuchs, Governor-General of the Belgian Congo (1912–1916)

France
 French Somaliland –
 Pierre Hubert Auguste Pascal, Governor of French Somaliland (1911–1915)
 Paul Simoni, Governor of French Somaliland (1915–1916)
 Guinea –
 Jean Jules Émile Peuvergne, Lieutenant-Governor of Guinea (1913–1915)
 Jean Louis Georges Poiret, Lieutenant-Governor of Guinea (1915–1919)

Japan
 Karafuto – Okada Bunji, Governor-General of Karafuto (5 June 1914 – 9 October 1916)
 Korea – Terauchi Masatake, Governor-General of Korea (1910–1916)
 Taiwan –
Sakuma Samata, Governor-General of Taiwan (15 April 1906 – May 1915)
Andō Sadami, Governor-General of Taiwan (May 1915 – June 1916)

Portugal
 Angola –
 José Mendes Ribeiro Norton de Matos, Governor-General of Angola (1912–1915)
 António Júlio da Costa Pereira de Eça, Governor-General of Angola (1915–1916)

United Kingdom
 Barbados – Sir Leslie Probyn, Governor of Barbados (1911–1918)
 British East Africa – Sir Henry Conway Belfield, Governor of British East Africa (1912–1917)
 British Honduras – Wilfred Collet, Governor of British Honduras (1913–1918)
 Falkland Islands – William Lamond Allardyce, Governor of the Falkland Islands (1904–1915)
 Fiji – Sir Ernest Sweet-Escott, Governor of Fiji (1912–1918)
 Malta Colony
Leslie Rundle, Governor of Malta (1909–1915)
Paul Methuen, Governor of Malta (1915–1919)
 Northern Rhodesia – Lawrence Aubrey Wallace, Administrator of Northern Rhodesia (1911–1921)

Colonial governors
Colonial governors
1915